Craig Paterson (born 2 October 1959 in South Queensferry) is a Scottish former football player, who currently works as a pundit for BBC Radio Scotland and Sportscene.

The son of former Hibernian defender Jock Paterson, Paterson also played for the Edinburgh club until he was signed by Rangers for £200,000 in August 1982. He later played for Motherwell, Kilmarnock and Hamilton Academical, before ending his playing career at Scottish Junior club Glenafton from New Cumnock.

Paterson captained Rangers in the 1984/85 Scottish League Cup final and won the 1990–91 Scottish Cup with Motherwell. He has worked in the Scottish sports media since his retirement, initially with Radio Forth, before joining the BBC.

References

External links 
 

1959 births
Living people
Footballers from Edinburgh
Association football defenders
Scottish footballers
Hibernian F.C. players
Rangers F.C. players
Motherwell F.C. players
Kilmarnock F.C. players
Hamilton Academical F.C. players
Scottish Football League players
Scottish Junior Football Association players
Scottish association football commentators
Bonnyrigg Rose Athletic F.C. players
Glenafton Athletic F.C. players
Scotland under-21 international footballers